Bulgarian Democratic Party (in Bulgarian: Българска демократическа партия) is a political party in Bulgaria. The party was founded on June 1, 1990. The party is led by Julio Denev.

Political parties in Bulgaria